The Battle Among the Clans (大香港) is a Hong Kong clan drama series produced by TVB that took place from the mid-1940s to 1950s.

Plot
The story begins with the Japanese occupation of Hong Kong coming to an end in 1945 and the remaining Japanese dying or leaving the territory.  The British colonial government have yet to fully resume its duties.  Citizens themselves are flushing out the remaining traitors one by one.  Soon, multiple societies of different legions were formed within the HK underground.  Each one tries to control the city in a time of very weak and corrupt governance.  Eventually the big clans merge, expand and betray one another.  The two major rivals, one run by the Lok family head Lok Zung-hing (Chow Yun-fat), the other by Ng Yat-tin (Tai Chi-wai) would collide.

Production note
Five years prior to the release of this series, the producer Chiu Chun-keung (招振強) collaborated with Chow-Yun-fat to release The Bund, a similarly themed story except in Shanghai instead of Hong Kong.

Cast

References

See also
 The Bund (TV series)
 Chow Yun-fat filmography

TVB dramas
1985 Hong Kong television series debuts
1985 Hong Kong television series endings
1980s Hong Kong television series
Serial drama television series
Period television series
Television series set in the 1940s
Television series set in the 1950s
Cantonese-language television shows